Hou De Jarasa Ushir (Let There Be A Little Delay) is an Indian Marathi film directed by Wasim Maner, Produced by Tahir Maner under Biroba Films and distributed by Abhijit Gholap of Devisha Films]. Hou De Jarasa Ushir is the first Marathi film to be selected among top 282 films for a nomination in Best Film Category for Oscars. The film's screenplay has already been preserved by Academy of Motion Picture Arts and Sciences library for research purposes.

Cast 

 Sadashiv Amrapurkar as Fakir Baba
 Aishwarya Narkar as Rukmini Pawar
 Sharvari Jamenis as Sunaina Pandit
 Chinmay Mandlekar as Sarjerao Patil
 Aditi Sarangdhar as Monali Mohite
 Jayawant Wadkar as Marutrao Mohite
 Raj Ranaware as Malhar Gaikwad 
 Abhyangh Kuvalekar as Shantanu Jahagirdar
 Anil Nagarkar as Shabbir Tamboli
 Priya Shinde as Swapna
 Vishwas Sakat as Bhavadya
 Akshay Waghmare as Mohanya
 Rajesh More as Dattu Pawar
 Manoj Narule as Sunil Pawar
 Sanyogita Bhave as Sneha Gosavi
 Mahesh Ghag as Shankar

Plot 

Hou De Jarasa Ushir (Let There Be A Little Delay) is the story of three people working at a software company. Every morning, they travel to work together in the same cab. HDJU paints a single day in their life where the journey from their homes to the office makes them to look at the world quite differently.

Release 

Hou De Jarasa Ushir is released on 18 January 2013 all over Maharashtra. It was released in California United States on 23 November 2012.

Music 

Music of Hou De Jarasa Ushir is composed by Nakul Shirish Jogdeo and lyrics are written by Rahul Gautam Ovhal.

References

External links 

 

2012 films
2010s Marathi-language films